The R390 road is a regional road in Ireland linking Athlone to Mullingar, all of it within County Westmeath. It passes through the town of Ballymore, and several hamlets, before terminating in Mullingar.

See also
Roads in Ireland
National primary road
National secondary road

References
Roads Act 1993 (Classification of Regional Roads) Order 2006 – Department of Transport

Regional roads in the Republic of Ireland
Roads in County Westmeath